Rimington is a rural village and civil parish in the Ribble Valley, Lancashire, England. The population of the civil parish was 382 at the 2001 Census, however at the 2011 Census Middop was included with Rimington giving a total of 480. It is east of Clitheroe and south of the A59 road.  The village consists of the hamlets of Howgill, Martin Top, Newby, and Stopper Lane, and was formerly in the West Riding of Yorkshire.

The parish adjoins the Ribble Valley parishes of Gisburn, Sawley, Downham, Twiston and Middop the Pendle parish of Barley-with-Wheatley Booth.

History
The village was listed in the Domesday Book as "Renistone". The name Boulton (Bolton) is listed in land deeds of 1302, and Robert Elwald son of Alan listed 1304.

Since Tudor times, until the late 19th century,  lead mining was an important industry around the village. At one time silver was derived as a by-product of the mining, to the extent that Queen Elizabeth I declared the Stopper Lane Mine as being a Mine Royal.

Francis Duckworth (1862–1941) was born in the village, and composed several hymn tunes including one named after the village. There is a plaque to his memory was placed above the doorway to the former Methodist Chapel in Stopper Lane. Salem Chapel, the local Congregational Church at Martin Top, was founded in 1816 and continues to serve the area.
 
Rimington railway station opened in 1872 and closed in 1959, and was on the Ribble Valley Line.

Rimington Memorial Institute was built in 1927 to commemorate the First World War and still serves as the venue for parish council, the Women's Institute and garden club meetings, indoor bowls, table tennis, whist and domino drives, as well as village dances and other events. It has recently been refurbished and upgraded.

Governance
Rimington was once a township in the ancient parish of Gisburn, in the Staincliffe Wapentake of the West Riding of Yorkshire. This became a civil parish in 1866, forming part of the Bowland Rural District from 1894 to 1974. It has since become part of the Lancashire borough of Ribble Valley. The parish council is called Rimington and Middop, and is shared with Middop, a small rural parish east of Rimington with a population of 43 at the 2001 census, (2001 Census)

Along with Middop, Gisburn, Gisburn Forest, Paythorne, Newsholme and Horton, the parish forms the Gisburn, Rimington ward of Ribble Valley Borough Council.

Media gallery

See also

Listed buildings in Rimington

References

External links

Francis Duckworth, composer of the hymn tune "Rimington"
Rimington Village (www.gisburn.org.uk)
rimmington.org
martintop.org.uk

Villages in Lancashire
Geography of Ribble Valley
Civil parishes in Lancashire